The Astral is a German single-place paraglider that was designed and produced by Swing Flugsportgeräte of Landsberied. It is now out of production.

Design and development
The Astral was designed as an intermediate glider. A two-seat tandem version was also developed for flight training, the Astral Twin.

The design has progressed through seven generations of models, each improving on the last. The models are each named for their approximate projected wing area in square metres.

Operational history
Reviewer Noel Bertrand described the Astral in a 2003 review as "a very good DHV 2 [glider]".

Variants

Astral 2
Astral 2 24
Small-sized model for lighter pilots. The glider model is Deutscher Hängegleiterverband e.V. (DHV) 2 GH certified.
Astral 2 26
Mid-sized model for medium-weight pilots. The glider model is DHV 2 GH certified.
Astral 2 28
Large-sized model for heavier pilots. The glider model is DHV 2 GH certified.

Astral 3
Astral 3 22
Small-sized model for lighter pilots. The glider model is DHV 2-3 certified.
Astral 3 24
Mid-sized model for medium-weight pilots. The glider model is DHV 2 certified.
Astral 3 26
Large-sized model for heavier pilots. The glider model is DHV 2 certified.
Astral 3 28
Extra large-sized model for heavier pilots. The glider model is DHV 2 certified.

Astral 4
Astral 4 22
Small-sized model for lighter pilots. The glider model is DHV LTF 2 certified.
Astral 4 24
Mid-sized model for medium-weight pilots. The glider model is DHV LTF 2 certified.
Astral 4 26
Large-sized model for heavier pilots. The glider model is DHV LTF 2 certified.
Astral 4 28
Extra large-sized model for heavier pilots. The glider model is DHV LTF 2 certified.

Astral 5
Astral 5 22
Small-sized model for lighter pilots. The glider model is DHV LTF 2 certified.
Astral 5 24
Mid-sized model for medium-weight pilots. The glider model is DHV LTF 2 certified.
Astral 5 26
Large-sized model for heavier pilots. The glider model is DHV LTF 2 certified.
Astral 5 28
Extra large-sized model for heavier pilots. The glider model is DHV LTF 2 certified.

Astral 6
Astral 6 22
Small-sized model for lighter pilots. The glider model is DHV LTF 2 and CEN C certified.
Astral 6 24
Mid-sized model for medium-weight pilots. The glider model is DHV LTF 2 and CEN C certified.
Astral 6 26
Large-sized model for heavier pilots. The glider model is DHV LTF 2 and CEN C certified.
Astral 6 28
Extra large-sized model for heavier pilots. The glider model is DHV LTF 2 and CEN C certified.

Astral 7
Astral 7 22
Small-sized model for lighter pilots. The glider model is DHV LTF C and CEN C certified.
Astral 7 24
Mid-sized model for medium-weight pilots. The glider model is DHV LTF C and CEN C certified.
Astral 7 26
Large-sized model for heavier pilots. The glider model is DHV LTF C and CEN C certified.
Astral 7 28
Extra large-sized model for heavier pilots. The glider model is DHV LTF C and CEN C certified.

Specifications (Astral 3 24)

References

External links

Astral
Paragliders